Hotel Interludes (released 2011 in Oslo, Norway by Curling Legs – CLP CD 122) is the debut solo piano album by the pianist Eyolf Dale.

Critical reception 

The review by Terje Mosnes of the Norwegian newspaper Dagbladet awarded the album 5 stars (dice), and the reviewer Tor Hammerø of the Norwegian newspaper NettAvisen awarded the album 5 stars (dice)

Dale shows instrumentalist and composer skills, to an exceptional extent. He was recognized in Norway already in 2008 when he and saxophonist André Roligheten won Jazzintro award within the duo Albatrosh. Since then he has taken new steps as a performer, composer and producer, until he now presents his own expression in album format. From the first note he makes it clear that he has a sense of rich, singing piano tone and he does sound treatment seriously. This musical expression is more than mature for world jazz scene.

Track listing 
All compositions by Eyolf Dale
«Shades Of History» (7:18)
«Hotel Interlude» (1:31)
«Prolleprepp» (4:52)
«Grand (Hotel)» (5:40)
«Shades Of What» (6:07)
«Bewarmth» (6:34)
«Pralleperp» (6:19)
«Cloud Nine» (7:17)
«Homage To Trains Itself» (5:18)
Recorded in Recorded at Store Studio NRK, February 1st, 2011 & tracks 3, 7 & 8 recorded live in concert at Levinsalen, Norw. State Academy of Music (NMH), April 27th, 2011

Personnel 
Eyolf Dale - piano

Notes 
Recorded at Store Studio NRK, February 1, 2011
Tracks 3, 7 & 8 recorded live in concert at Levinsalen, Norw. State Academy of Music (NMH), April 27, 2011

References 

Eyolf Dale albums
Solo piano jazz albums
2012 albums